CSS Nashville was a brig-rigged, side-paddle-wheel passenger steamer that served with the Confederate Navy during the Civil War.

History
Originally a United States Mail Service ship, the USMS Nashville was built at Greenpoint, Brooklyn in 1853. Between 1853 and 1861 she was engaged in running between New York City and Charleston, South Carolina.  During the Battle of Fort Sumter, the USMS Nashville sailed into Charleston without flying the US national standard and was fired upon by the USRC Harriet Lane which marked the first shot of the naval war in the Civil War.  The Nashville raised the American flag, and after the surrender of Sumter, the Nashville docked at Charleston.

After the fall of Fort Sumter, the Confederates captured her at Charleston and fitted her out as a cruiser. Under the command of Lieutenant Robert B. Pegram, CSN, she ran the blockade on October 21, 1861, and headed across the Atlantic to Southampton, England, the first ship of war to fly the Confederate flag in English waters. On November 19, 1861, near the British Isles, she boarded and burned an American merchant ship, the Harvey Birch, the first such action by a Confederate commerce raider in the North Atlantic during the war.

Nashville returned to Beaufort, North Carolina on February 28, 1862, having captured two prizes worth US$66,000 during the cruise. In this interval she was sold for use as a blockade runner and renamed Thomas L. Wragg.

On November 5, 1862, she was commissioned as the privateer Rattlesnake. After she ran fast aground on the Ogeechee River, Georgia, the monitor  destroyed her with shell fire from 11-inch (279-mm) and 15-inch (381-mm) turret guns on February 28, 1863.

See also

Ships captured in the American Civil War
Bibliography of American Civil War naval history

References

External links

 Machinery from the C.S.S. Nashville historical marker
 Destruction of the C.S.S. Nashville historical marker
 Sinking of CSS Nashville historical marker

Cruisers of the Confederate States Navy
Blockade runners of the Confederate States Navy
Shipwrecks in rivers
Ships built in Brooklyn
1853 ships
Shipwrecks of the Georgia (U.S. state) coast
Shipwrecks of the American Civil War
Maritime incidents in February 1863
Captured ships
Naval magazine explosions